Jansy Sarely Aguirre Arana (born 18 February 1991) is a Nicaraguan footballer who plays as a forward for the Nicaragua women's national team.

Early life
Aguirre was born in Jinotepe.

International career
Aguirre capped for Nicaragua at senior level during the 2012 CONCACAF Women's Olympic Qualifying Tournament qualification, two Central American and Caribbean Games editions (2014 and 2018) and the 2018 CONCACAF Women's Championship qualification.

References 

1991 births
Living people
People from Carazo Department
Nicaraguan women's footballers
Women's association football forwards
Nicaragua women's international footballers